Soak may refer to:

 Steeping
 Bathing
 Soakage (source of water), a source of water in Australian deserts
 Soak dike, ditch or drain
 Soak testing, a method of system testing in computing and electronics
 Soak (singer), Irish singer-songwriter
 Soak (album), 2013 album by Foetus
 SOAK, a Burning Man regional event in Portland, Oregon, USA

See also
 Soak City (disambiguation)
 Soaked (disambiguation)
 Soaking (disambiguation)
 Soke (disambiguation)
 Souq, a marketplace consisting of multiple small stalls or shops